The First Presbyterian Church of Chandler is a historic Presbyterian church at 8th and Blaine Streets in Chandler, Oklahoma. It was built in 1894 and added to the National Register in 1984.

References

External links
 

Presbyterian churches in Oklahoma
Churches on the National Register of Historic Places in Oklahoma
Carpenter Gothic church buildings in Oklahoma
Churches completed in 1894
National Register of Historic Places in Lincoln County, Oklahoma
1894 establishments in Oklahoma Territory
Chandler, Oklahoma